Meili Faille (born June 18, 1972) is a Canadian politician. She was a Bloc Québécois member of the House of Commons of Canada, being first elected in the 2004 election in the district of Vaudreuil-Soulanges. Prior to being elected, Faille was a consultant and project coordinator. From 2004 to 2008 she was the Bloc shadow critic of Citizenship and Immigration.

During the 38th Parliament, Meili Faille was Vice-Chair of Standing Committee on Citizenship and Immigration (CIMM) from October 14, 2004 through October 7, 2005.

Faille, a Canadian of Taiwanese descent, was born in Montreal, Quebec. Prior to being elected,  Faille was Project Leader and Primary Consultant for Groupe LGS (1996–2004). Faille has worked as intern for the Secretary General of the Canadian Human Rights Commission (1993), was Ministerial editor for special projects and briefing notes for the Minister of Employment and Immigration (1992–1993, was an intern in the Cabinet for the Minister of Physical Education and Amateur Sports (1991–1992), was an intern in the Cabinet for the Solicitor General of Canada (1990–1991) and was an intern in the cabinet of the Minister of Northern Canadian and Indian Affairs (1989).

Faille holds a Bachelor's in Business Administration from the University of Quebec in Hull, Quebec, and studied Applied Sciences and Chemical Engineering at the University of Ottawa.

Faille studied classical (7 years) and contemporary (2 years) piano and followed an apprenticeship for two years under renowned artist Marcel Bourbonnais.

References

External links
 How'd They Vote?: Meili Faille's voting history and quotes
 Faille's Official Website
 
 Press Release: Federal MP Meili Faille to Cut Ribbon at Grand Opening Ceremony for Brooks Pepperfire Foods Inc.

1972 births
Bloc Québécois MPs
Canadian people of Taiwanese descent
Women members of the House of Commons of Canada
Living people
Members of the House of Commons of Canada from Quebec
People from Vaudreuil-Dorion
Politicians from Montreal
Université du Québec en Outaouais alumni
University of Ottawa alumni
Women in Quebec politics
21st-century Canadian politicians
21st-century Canadian women politicians
Canadian politicians of Chinese descent